The 1965 New York Yankees season was the 63rd season for the Yankees. The team finished with a record of 77–85, finishing 25 games behind the Minnesota Twins. New York was managed by Johnny Keane.

This season marked the beginning of a downturn for the Yankees before a resurgence in the mid-1970s. This was the first season since 1925 that they failed to finish either above the .500 mark or in the first division. They would finish last in 1966, their first time doing so since 1912.

Offseason 
 October 21, 1964: Ralph Terry was sent by the Yankees to the Cleveland Indians to partially complete an earlier deal (the Yankees sent players to be named later and $75,000 to the Indians for Pedro Ramos) made on September 5, 1964. The Yankees sent Bud Daley to the Indians on November 27 to complete the trade.
 November 30, 1964: Ellie Rodríguez was drafted by the Yankees from the Kansas City Athletics in the 1964 first-year draft.
 November 30, 1964: Duke Carmel was drafted by the Yankees from the New York Mets in the 1964 rule 5 draft.
 Prior to 1965 season: Al Closter was signed by the Yankees as an amateur free agent.

First game in the Astrodome 
 April 9, 1965: The Houston Colt .45s became the Houston Astros and inaugurated indoor baseball in the Astrodome with a 2–1 exhibition win over the Yankees. In this game, Mickey Mantle hit the first home run in the history of the Astrodome.

Regular season 
Bobby Murcer made his major league debut on September 8. He recorded his first hit on September 14, it was a two-run home run off Senators pitcher Jim Duckworth.

On October 3, Tony Kubek hit a home run in the last at-bat of his career.

Season standings

Record vs. opponents

Notable transactions 
 May 3, 1965: Johnny Blanchard and Rollie Sheldon were traded by the Yankees to the Kansas City Athletics for Doc Edwards.
 June 8, 1965: 1965 Major League Baseball draft
Bill Burbach was drafted by the Yankees in the 1st round (19th pick).
Tom Shopay was drafted by the Yankees in the 34th round.

Roster

Player stats

Batting

Starters by position 
Note: Pos = Position; G = Games played; AB = At bats; H = Hits; Avg. = Batting average; HR = Home runs; RBI = Runs batted in

Other batters 
Note: G = Games played; AB = At bats; H = Hits; Avg. = Batting average; HR = Home runs; RBI = Runs batted in

Pitching

Starting pitchers 
Note: G = Games pitched; IP = Innings pitched; W = Wins; L = Losses; ERA = Earned run average; SO = Strikeouts

Other pitchers 
Note: G = Games pitched; IP = Innings pitched; W = Wins; L = Losses; ERA = Earned run average; SO = Strikeouts

Relief pitchers 
Note: G = Games pitched; W = Wins; L = Losses; SV = Saves; ERA = Earned run average; SO = Strikeouts

Awards and honors 
Mickey Mantle, Hutch Award
1965 MLB All-Star Game
 Elston Howard
 Mickey Mantle
 Joe Pepitone
 Bobby Richardson
 Mel Stottlemyre

Farm system 

LEAGUE CHAMPIONS: Columbus, Fort Lauderdale, Binghamton

Notes

References 
1965 New York Yankees at Baseball Reference
1965 New York Yankees at Baseball Almanac

New York Yankees seasons
New York Yankees
New York Yankees
1960s in the Bronx